Virgil Fackney Bozeman, Jr. (June 6, 1912 – March 9, 2007) was an American lawyer and politician.

Born in Fort Smith, Arkansas, Bozeman moved with his family to Moline, Illinois. Bozeman graduated from Moline High School and served in the United States Army Air Forces during World War II. Bozeman went to University of Illinois, University of Iowa, and Augustana College. He received his law degree from Southern Methodist University Law School and taught law at the law school. He practiced law in Dallas, Texas and then moved back to Moline, Illinois where he continued to practice law. Bozeman served in the Illinois House of Representatives in 1949 and 1950 and was a Democrat. He died at the Fairview Baptist Home in Downers Grove, Illinois.

Notes

External links

1912 births
2007 deaths
Politicians from Dallas
People from Moline, Illinois
Politicians from Fort Smith, Arkansas
United States Army Air Forces soldiers
Military personnel from Illinois
Military personnel from Texas
Augustana College (Illinois) alumni
University of Illinois Urbana-Champaign alumni
University of Iowa faculty
Southern Methodist University alumni
Southern Methodist University faculty
Illinois lawyers
Lawyers from Dallas
Democratic Party members of the Illinois House of Representatives
20th-century American politicians
United States Army Air Forces personnel of World War II
20th-century American lawyers